Qiang was a name given to various groups of people at different periods in ancient China. The Qiang people are generally thought to have been of Tibeto-Burman origin, though there are other theories.

The Tangut people of the Tang, Song and Yuan dynasties may be of Qiang descent. The modern Qiang people as well as Tibetans may also have been descended in part from the ancient Qiangs.

Etymology
According to the Han dynasty dictionary Shuowen Jiezi, the Qiang were shepherds, and the Chinese character for Qiang was thus formed from the characters for "sheep" (羊) and "man" (人), and pronounced like "sheep". Fengsu Tongyi also mentions that character of Qiang was formed from the words "sheep" and "man". Modern scholars have attempted to reconstruct the ancient pronunciation of Qiang: sinologist Edwin Pulleyblank reconstructs it to *kʰiaŋ in Middle Chinese, while William H. Baxter and Laurent Sagart reconstruct the Old Chinese name of Qiang as *C.qʰaŋ.

Qiangs are generally believed to be Tibeto-Burman speakers, although Christopher Beckwith proposes that the word "Qiang" may have an Indo-European etymology and that the Qiang were of Indo-European origin; Beckwith compares a proposed reconstruction of Qiang to *klaŋ in Old Chinese to the Tocharian word , meaning "to ride, go by wagon", as in "to ride off to hunt from a chariot", so that Qiang could actually mean "charioteer".

History

According to a legend, the Qiang were partly descended from the Yan Emperor, the mythical "Flame Emperor." The Yan Emperor and his tribe were defeated by the Yellow Emperor.

Origins
The term "Qiang" first appeared on oracle bone inscriptions 3,000 years ago and was used to describe "a people other than one's people." It appears again in the Classic of Poetry in reference to Tang of Shang (trad. 1675–1646 BC). They seem to have lived in a diagonal band from northern Shaanxi to northern Henan, somewhat to the south of the later Beidi. They were enemy of the Shang dynasty, who mounted expeditions against them, capturing slaves and victims for human sacrifice. The Qiang prisoners were skilled in making oracle bones.

This ancient tribe is said to be the progenitor of both the modern Qiang and the Tibetan people.  There are still many ethnological and linguistic links between the Qiang and the Tibetans. The Qiang tribe expanded eastward and joined the Han people in the course of historical development, while the other branch that traveled southwards, crosses over the Hengduan Mountains, and entered the Yungui Plateau; some went even farther, to Burma, forming numerous ethnic groups of the Tibetan-Burmese language family. Even today, from linguistic similarities, their relative relationship can be seen. They formed the Tibetan ethnicity after the unification of the Tubo kingdom. According to Fei Xiaotong: "Even if the Qiang people might not be regarded as the main source of the Tibetan people, it is undoubtedly that the Qiang people played a certain role in the formation of Tibetan race".

Shuowen Jiezi indicated that the Qiangs were shepherds from the west and they were part of the Xirong. They had a close relation to the Zhou dynasty, and were mentioned in the Book of Documents and Records of the Grand Historian as one of the allies of King Wu of Zhou who defeated the Shang. It has been suggested that the clan of Jiang Yuan, mother of Houji, a figure of Chinese legends and mythology and an ancestor of the Zhou dynasty, was possibly related or identical to the Qiang. Some of the ancient groups were called the "Horse-Qiang" or "Many-Horse-Qiang" (Ma Qiang or Duo Ma Qiang), suggesting they may have been horse breeders.

During the Han dynasty, a group of nomads to the southwest of Dunhuang were known as the Chuo Qiang.  They were described in the Book of Han as a people who moved with their livestock in search of water and pasture, made military weapons themselves using iron from the mountains, and possessed bows, lances, short knives, swords and armour. In the Weilüe, other Qiang tribes named were the "Brown Onion", "White Horse", and "Yellow Ox" Qiang.  The various tribes of the Qiangs formed a confederation against the Han but were defeated.

Later in the Han dynasty, groups of people in the western part of Sichuan were mentioned in the Book of the Later Han as separate branches of the Qiang. A song from one of these groups, the "White Wolf" people, was transcribed in Chinese characters together with Chinese translation, and the language has since been identified as a Tibeto-Burman language.

Han
In the mid-2nd century BCE, elements of the Lesser Yuezhi reportedly migrated into southern Gansu, where they subsequently merged with the Qiang population.

In 112 BCE, the Han dynasty invaded what is now eastern Tibet with 25,000 cavalry on grounds of Qiang raiding.

In 65 BCE, the Qiang revolted in what is now eastern Tibet.

In 42 BCE, the Qiang rebelled and defeated a force of 12,000 under Feng Fengshi.

In 41 BCE, Feng Fengshi returned to what is now eastern Tibet with 60,000 men and crushed the Qiang rebellion.

In 49 CE, the Qiang tribes retook the Qinghai region from the Han.

In 57 CE, the Qiang led by Dianyu raided Jincheng Commandery.

In 59 CE, a Han army defeated Dianyu.

In 107 CE, Dianlian of the Qiang Xianlian attacked Liang Province. As a result, the Protectorate of the Western Regions was abandoned. The Han court sent Deng Zhi and Ren Shang against the invading army, and although the Qiang forces suffered significant casualties, they were defeated at Hanyang Commandery. Having achieved victory against the Han army, Dianlian proclaimed himself emperor at Beidi Commandery. Qiang forces now threatened Han territory as far south as Hanzhong Commandery and as far east as Ji Province.

In 109 CE, Dianlian conquered Longxi Commandery.

In 110 CE, Dianlian defeated and killed the Administrator Zheng Qin in Hanzhong Commandery.

In 112 CE, Dianlian died and was succeeded by his son Lianchang. Lianchang was too young to exercise authority and another man of the tribe, Langmo, took charge of strategy. The new regime was significantly less effective under the regent and failed to make any headway against Han forces.

In 116 CE, the Han general Deng Zun led 10,000 Southern Xiongnu cavalry in a raid on Lianchang's headquarters from the north. Meanwhile Ren Shang attacked from the south and killed Lianchang's wife and children.

In 117 CE, Lianchang was assassinated and forces under Ren Shang ended Qiang raids.

In 120 CE, the Qiang chieftain Jiwu attacked Jincheng Commandery and was defeated by the general Ma Xian.

In 121 CE, the Qiang Shaodang tribe under Manu raided Wuwei Commandery but were defeated by the general Ma Xian the following year.

In 140 CE, the Qiang rebelled.

In 142 CE, the Qiang rebellion was put down.

In 167 CE, Duan Jiong conducted an anti-Qiang campaign and massacred Qiang populations as well as settled them outside the frontier.

In 184 CE, Beigong Boyu, a member of the Auxiliary of Loyal Barbarians of Huangzhong, started the Liang Province rebellion. The rebels captured Jincheng and reached Youfufeng Commandery in 185, and from there carried out raids against Chang'an. A Han army was sent out against them led by Huangfu Song and Zhang Wen but they failed to achieve any major victory. In 185, the Han general Dong Zhuo won a battle against Beigong Boyu and the rebels withdrew. Beigong Boyu and Li Wenhou are not mentioned after this, but the rebellion continued anyway when the new Inspector was killed by his own troops.

Sixteen Kingdoms
During the era of Sixteen Kingdoms, a Qiang leader, Yao Chang, founded the state of Later Qin 384–417 CE).

Northern and Southern dynasties
During the period of Northern and Southern dynasties, Fan Ye (398–445) wrote a history of the Western Qiang describing traits such as "disheveled hair", folding their coat from the left side, and marriage customs where a widow would either marry her son or the deceased husband's brother. According to Fan, the Qiang lived in tribes and had no unified ruler.

In 446 an ethnic Qiang rebellion was crushed by the Northern Wei. Wang Yu (王遇) was an ethnic Qiang eunuch and he may have been castrated during the rebellion since the Northern Wei would castrated the rebel tribe's young elite. Fengyi prefecture's Lirun town according to the Weishu was where Wang Yu was born, Lirun was to Xi'ans's northeast by 100 miles and modern day Chengcheng stands at its site. Wang Yu patronized Buddhism and in 488 had a temple constructed in his birthplace.

Tang
During the Tang dynasty, the Dangxiang Qiang moved to the region of Xiazhou around modern Jingbian County, Shaanxi Province. They eventually founded the state of Western Xia (1038–1227 CE) and came to be known as the Tanguts. Another group of Qiang migrated south to the Min River in modern Sichuan Province. They came to be known as the Ran and Mang who were the ancestors of the modern Qiang people.

Tibetan Empire
According to the New Book of Tang, the "Bod originates from the Qiang." According to the Da Qing yi tong zhi (1735), the Tibetan Empire was founded by a branch of the Fa Qiang.

Song
According to the polymath Shen Kuo, the Qiang were noted for producing high quality steel armour.

Yuan
During the Yuan dynasty, the term Qiang was replaced by Fan (Bod), and the people of the western plateaus were called "Western Bod". The two terms were used interchangeably until the Qing dynasty when Qiang came to refer to those living upstream of the Min River.

Language

The Qiang did not have surnames until the last few hundred years when they adopted Han Chinese surnames.

Culture

The Qiang were first described as nomadic shepherds living in the region of contemporary Gansu and Qinghai provinces. Unlike other nomads, the Qiang did not shave their heads and wore their hair loose over their face. At some point prior to the modern era they settled and adopted an agricultural way of life. Due to constant conflict between Qiang tribes and other peoples, the Qiang built numerous stone guard towers with small windows and doors, giving them the moniker of "Stone Tower Culture". These constructs, described as Himalayan Towers, can be found today in eastern Tibet and Sichuan Province.

Qiang society followed matrilineal descent and it was men who integrated into the women's lineage at their deaths. There was no formal marriage ceremony or ritual. Instead the men traveled to their wives' residences and worked their land for a long period of time as bride service. Despite the centrality of women in Qiang families, Qiang society was neither matriarchal or egalitarian. Men held all the important political and religious positions, although there is some evidence that female shamans existed at one point. Like most agricultural societies, women were responsible for domestic and agricultural work while men engaged in construction, transport, and plowing.

The Qiang revered the tiger and featured it prominently on their totem poles. White stones were also considered to be sacred and sometimes put on altars or rooftops. Qiang folk religion resembles animism and shamanism. It places spiritual belief in the natural features of the landscape and the ability of shamans to contact spirits.

Relation to modern Qiang

Tribes and chiefs
Bi'nan
Goujiu 
Dianyu II (184)
Qian
Midanger (60)
Shaodang (Yan)
Shaodang (40 BCE)
Dianliang (40)
Western Qiang
Fu Fan (6)
Pang Tian (6)
Xianlian
Yangyu (60)
Youfei (60)
Dianlian (r.107–112)
Lianchang (d.117)
Langmo (r.112–118)
Zhong
?
Beigong Boyu
Diaoku
Dize
Erku
Juzhong
Li Lu
Lianger
Miwang
Quhu lai Wang
Ruoling
Yangdiao

See also 
Qiang people
Tangut people
Gyalrong people 
Tibetan people
Achang people
Bamar people
Sumpa
Mosuo
Nakhi people
Pumi people
Yi people
Ethnic groups in Chinese history

Footnotes

References

 

Ancient peoples of China
Ethnic groups in Chinese history
Five Barbarians